Vaz also may refer to:

Vaz (surname), people named Vaz
Vaz, Iran (disambiguation), places in Iran
AutoVAZ, a Russian automobile manufacturer
VAZ, a Swedish record producer duo.